NGC 7096 is a grand-design spiral galaxy located about 130 million light-years away in the constellation of Indus. NGC 7096 is also part of a group of galaxies that contains the galaxy NGC 7083. NGC 7096 was discovered by astronomer John Herschel on August 31, 1836.

See also 
 NGC 7001

References

External links 

Unbarred spiral galaxies
Indus (constellation)
7096
67168
IC objects
Astronomical objects discovered in 1836